Rudy Robles (born Pastor Lluviosa Robles, 29 April 1910 – 11 August 1970) was a Filipino film and television actor. He was one of the first Filipino actors to appear in Hollywood movies.

Career
Robles was born in Tacloban, in the Eastern Visayas region of the Philippines, where he began his schooling before emigrating to the United States. He completed high school and college in California, where he excelled in debating and acting. Producer Samuel Goldwyn reportedly discovered and gave him the screen name Rudy Robles whilst he was working as a bellhop at The Beverly Hills Hotel in Hollywood.

His credits include pre- and post-World War II films, such as Lt. Yabo in The Real Glory (1939) starring Gary Cooper and David Niven. HIs uncredited roles include appearances in The Adventures of Martin Eden (1942), Wake Island (1942), Manila Calling (1942), and he played a Filipino assassin in the 1942 film Across the Pacific.

During World War II, Robles entered the U.S. Army and served in Australia, New Guinea and the Philippines with the 1st Filipino Infantry Regiment, rising to the rank of first sergeant. After the war Robles was commissioned a second lieutenant in the U.S. Army Civil Affairs, where he contracted Filipino entertainers for the U.S. military. He returned to the U.S. and civilian life in February 1946.

In addition to appearing in several Hollywood films such as Nocturne (1946), Singapore (1947) (which starred Ava Gardner and Fred MacMurray) and Omoo-Omoo, the Shark God (1949), Robles returned to the Philippines where he raised a family and started to produce, direct and star in his own films. One of his last on-screen appearances was in an episode of Alfred Hitchcock Presents in 1956.

Death
On 11 August 1970, Robles died in Manila at the age of 60.

Filmography

References

External links
 

1910 births
1970 deaths
People from Tacloban
Male actors from Leyte (province)
20th-century Filipino male actors
Filipino emigrants to the United States
Filipino male film actors
Filipino film directors
Filipino film producers
Filipino male television actors
American military personnel of Filipino descent
United States Army personnel of World War II
United States Army officers